Mehináku (Meinaku) is an Arawakan language spoken by the Mehinaku people in the Xingu Indigenous Park of Brazil. One dialect, Waurá-kumá, is "somewhat intelligible" with Waurá due to influence from this language.

Phonology 
Mehináku features five vowels /a e i ɨ u/ which can be either oral or nasal /ã ẽ ĩ ɨ̃ ũ/.

The language has thirteen consonants.

References

Arawakan languages
Languages of Xingu Indigenous Park